Helga Schultze (2 February 1940 – 12 September 2015), also known by her married name Helga Hösl, was a German female tennis player who reached a singles ranking of No. 5 in 1964.

Schultze was born in Berlin on 2 February 1940, and after World War II, she moved with her family to Hanau, where she played for the local club THC Hanau.

Between 1961 and 1968 she competed in seven Wimbledon Championships. She achieved her best singles result at Wimbledon in 1962 when she reached the fourth round, losing to second-seeded Darlene Hard. She reached the semifinals at the 1964 French Championships where she lost in three sets to top-seeded and eventual champion Margaret Smith. At the U.S. Championships, she reached the third round in 1962 and 1964.

In 1964 Schultz and her teammate Norma Baylon reached the doubles final at the 1964 French Championships, losing to Margaret Smith and Lesley Turner.

Between 1964 and 1974, she participated in the German Fed Cup team and compiled a 14–11 win–loss record.

In 1970, she received the Silbernes Lorbeerblatt (Silver Laurel Leaf), the highest sports award in Germany.

After her tennis career, she wrote several books on tennis and nutrition.

Grand Slam finals

Doubles (1 runner-up)

References

External links
 
 

1940 births
2015 deaths
West German female tennis players
Tennis players from Berlin